Farmen 2017 (The Farm 2017) is the thirteenth season of the Norwegian version of The Farm reality television show. This season takes place on a farm located on the island of Flostaøya located in the municipality of Arendal in Norway. The season premiered on TV 2 on 25 September 2017 and concluded on 10 December 2017 where Halvor Sveen won in the final duel against Eunike Hoksrød to win the title of Farmen 2017.

Format
Fourteen contestants are chosen from the outside world. Each week one contestant is selected the Farmer of the Week. In the first week, the contestants choose the Farmer. Since week 2, the Farmer is chosen by the contestant evicted in the previous week.

Nomination process
The Farmer of the Week nominates two people (a man and a woman) as the Butlers. The others must decide which Butler is the first to go to the Battle. That person then chooses the second person (from the same sex) for the Battle and also the type of battle (a quiz, extrusion, endurance, sleight). The Battle winner must win two duels. The Battle loser is evicted from the game.

Finishing order
(ages stated are at time of contest)

Challengers 
On the fourth week, three challengers come to the farm where they'll live for one week while doing chores and getting to know the other contestants. At the end of the week, the contestants on the farm decide which one is allowed to stay on the farm and which two fight in a duel to determine who stays on The Farm and who goes home.

The game

References

External links

The Farm (franchise)
Norwegian reality television series
2017 Norwegian television seasons